Alfred Émile Moussambani (born February 25, 1974) is a Cameroonian sprinter who specializes in the 100 metres.  He represented his native country in the 1996 and 2000 Olympics as a member of his nation's 4x100 metres relay team.  Neither team advanced.  The other members of the 1996 team were Benjamin Sirimou, Aimé-Issa Nthépé and Claude Toukéné-Guébogo.  Members of the 2000 team were Serge Bengono, II, Joseph Batangdon, and Benjamin Sirimou.

Together with Serge Mbegomo, Claude Toukene and Joseph Batangdon he finished seventh in the 4 x 100 m relay final at the 2002 Commonwealth Games and again at the 2006 Commonwealth Games.

He also was a member of his national team at the 1997, 2001 and 2003 World Championships.

His personal bests are:
60m indoors	6.75		Liévin 17.02.2002
100m	10.42	+1.5	St-Etienne 30.06.2001
200m	21.80	+1.5	Tergnier  09.05.2002

He also ran 100m in 10.33 but with a +4.1 wind.

References

External links
 
 
 

1974 births
Living people
Cameroonian male sprinters
Olympic athletes of Cameroon
Athletes (track and field) at the 1996 Summer Olympics
Athletes (track and field) at the 2000 Summer Olympics
Commonwealth Games competitors for Cameroon
Athletes (track and field) at the 2002 Commonwealth Games
Athletes (track and field) at the 2006 Commonwealth Games
20th-century Cameroonian people
21st-century Cameroonian people